Nelli Ioffe (born 29 January 2004) is a Russian-Israeli figure skater. She is the 2020 Israeli national silver medalist and competed at the 2021 World Championships.

Programs

Competitive highlights 
CS: Challenger Series; JGP: Junior Grand Prix

References

External links 

 
 

2004 births
Living people
Russian female single skaters
Israeli female single skaters
People from Vladimir, Russia
Israeli people of Russian descent
Sportspeople from Vladimir Oblast